Paul Hoffman may refer to:

Sportspeople
Paul Hoffman (basketball) (1925–1998), American basketball player
Paul Hoffman (rowing) (born 1946), US Olympic rowing coxswain
Paul Hoffman (weightlifter) (born 1955), Swazi Olympic weightlifter

Writers
Paul Hoffman (English writer) (born 1953), English novelist
Paul Hoffman (science writer) (born 1956), American writer and television presenter
Paul Hoffman (business writer), American business writer

Others
Paul F. Hoffman (born 1941), geologist
Paul G. Hoffman (1891–1974), president of Studebaker and Economic Cooperation Administrator
Paul Hoffman (engineer), IETF participant and founder of imc.org and vpnc.org
 Paul E. Hoffman, American historian, winner of the Francis Parkman Prize

See also
Paul Hoffmann (disambiguation)